The SkyRace Comapedrosa is an international skyrunning competition held for the first time in 2014. It runs every year in Arinsal, La Massana (Andorra) in July and is a SkyRace part of the Skyrunner World Series.

Although the first edition, with its current name, of this race is of the 2014 (and from 2016 inserted in the World Cup circuit), since 2005 the SkyRace, which took place on Mount Coma Pedrosa, took place on a regular frequency every year, and almost always the race was valid for the Skyrunner World Series.

Editions
Eight times the race was valid as SkyRace for the Skyrunner World Series and one as Sky UltraMarathon. On another occasion it was part of the Skyrunner World Series Trails.

See also
 Coma Pedrosa
 Skyrunner World Series

References

External links 
 Official web site

Skyrunning competitions
Skyrunner World Series
Running in Andorra
Sports competitions in Andorra